Anin may refer to the following places in Poland:
Anin, Warsaw
Anin, Warmian-Masurian Voivodeship
Anin, West Pomeranian Voivodeship

See also 
Anin (surname)